This is a list of reptiles of American Samoa.

Marine reptiles
Sea turtles
Hawksbill sea turtle (Eretmochelys imbricata)                   
Green sea turtle (laumei ena’ena, fonu) (Chelonia mydas)
Olive ridley sea turtle (Lepidochelys olivacea)
Leatherback sea turtle (Dermochelys coriacea)

Sea snakes
Yellow-bellied sea snake (Hydrophis platurus)
Yellow-lipped sea krait (Laticauda colubrina)

Land reptiles

Geckos 
Pacific slender-toed gecko (Nactus pelagicus)
Oceanic gecko (Gehyra oceanica)
Mourning gecko (Lepidodactylus lugubris)
Stump-toed gecko (Gehyra mutilatus)
House gecko Hemidactylus frenatus   

Skinks
Pacific snake-eyed skink (Cryptoblepharus poecilopleurus) 
Micronesian skink (Emoia adspersa)
White-bellied / brown-tailed striped skink (Emoia cyanura)
Dark-bellied or blue-tailed striped skink (Emoia impar)
Günther's emo skink (Emoia lawesii)
Pacific black skink (Emoia nigra)
Samoan skink (Emoia samoensis)
Moth skink (Lipinia noctua) 

Snakes
Pacific boa (Candoia bibroni) (found on Ta‘ū island)
Brahminy blind snake (Indotyphlops braminus)

References

Reptiles
American Samoa
Reptiles of Oceania